Kʼan Moʼ Hix, (lived around 612), was a nobleman of the Maya city-state of Palenque. He was husband of Sak Kʼukʼ, queen of Palenque, and father of Kʼinich Janaab Pakal I, who was one of the greatest rulers of Palenque and was responsible for the construction or extension of some of Palenque's most notable surviving inscriptions and monumental architecture. He could be a possible father of Ajen Yohl Mat.

Sources 

7th-century deaths
Palenque